Lotnicze Warsztaty Doświadczalne (LWD) was the Polish aerospace manufacturer and construction bureau, located in Łódź, active between 1945 and 1950. The name meant Aircraft Experimental Workshops. It was the first Polish post-war aerospace construction bureau.

History

The World War II and German occupation destroyed the whole Polish aviation industry. As soon as eastern part of Poland was liberated, in October 1944 a group of designers gathered in Lublin in a Design Bureau of Ministry of Communication. It was directed by Aleksander Sułkowski, but the main designer became Tadeusz Sołtyk. In primitive conditions, the bureau started works upon a utility aircraft Szpak-1. In early 1945 the construction bureau moved to liberated Łódź and on April 1, 1945 there were created the Aircraft Experimental Workshops (LWD), subordinated to the Ministry of Communication.

The Szpak-1 was not built, but there was designed and built its  development variant, the LWD Szpak-2 utility plane. It first flew on October 28, 1945, as the first Polish post-war plane. Szpak-2 and Szpak-3 remained in single units, but in 1947 there was designed the LWD Szpak-4, which was the first Polish post-war plane built in series - a short series of 10 was manufactured in PZL-Mielec.

The next design was LWD Żak, two-seater touring and trainer plane of 1947. A series of 10 Żak-3 was built in LWD in 1948, plus prototypes of Żak-1, Żak-2 and Żak-4.

Most successful design of LWD was a military and civilian trainer LWD Junak of 1948. Its improved variants Junak-2 and Junak-3 were produced from 1951 in the WSK-4 Okęcie in Warsaw (a total of 252), although its further development was carried out outside of LWD. A civilian aerobatics and trainer variant of Junak was LWD Zuch of 1948; it was a successful design, but only 7 were built in LWD because of lack of proper engines.

LWD designed also two-engine light transport plane LWD Miś of 1949, but it was not successful and was not produced. The last LWD design was LWD Żuraw, two-seater military liaison and utility high-wing plane prototype completed in 1951. It was not produced either.

In 1950 LWD was converted from a construction bureau and experimental works to a production factory and renamed WSK-6 (Wytwórnia Sprzętu Komunikacyjnego 6 - Communication Equipment Factory 6). This put an end to its activity. Soon it was disbanded because of too small production capabilities. Tadeusz Sołtyk, a talented designer, organized next a construction bureau in the Aviation Institute in Warsaw.

Aircraft

References

Footnotes

Notes

Bibliography

External links

 Lotnicze Warsztaty Doświadczalne – Samoloty w Lotinctwie Polskim
 Lotnicze Warsztaty Doświadczalne LWD, Poland – Polish Propellers
 Polish Aviation Industry - Part 12 – Polot

Aircraft manufacturers of Poland
Science and technology in Poland